Diogo André Santos Nascimento (born 2 November 2002) is a Portuguese professional footballer who plays as a midfielder for Benfica B.

Club career
Having played for both Sporting CP and Belenenses, Nascimento joined Benfica in 2014. He signed his first professional contract in July 2021.

International career
Nascimento has represented Portugal at youth international level.

Career statistics

Club

Notes

Honours
Benfica
Under-20 Intercontinental Cup: 2022

References

2002 births
Living people
People from Leiria
Portuguese footballers
Portugal youth international footballers
Association football midfielders
Liga Portugal 2 players
Sporting CP footballers
C.F. Os Belenenses players
S.L. Benfica B players
Sportspeople from Leiria District